King's School is a station on the Port Authority of Allegheny County's light rail network, located in Bethel Park, Pennsylvania. The street level stop is designed as a small commuter stop, serving area residents who walk to the train so they can be taken toward Downtown Pittsburgh.

History
A stop was established at Kings School when the Pittsburgh Railways interurban line from Charleroi to Pittsburgh was opened through Bethel Park on September 12, 1903. Passengers initially changed at Castle Shannon to continue their journey to Downtown via the Pittsburgh and Castle Shannon Railroad. It was cut back to Library in 1953 and was converted from PCC operation to Light Rail in 1988.

References

External links 

Port Authority T Stations Listings
PCC 1776 at King's School stop in 1973
Station from Kings School Road from Google Maps Street View

Port Authority of Allegheny County stations
Railway stations in the United States opened in 1903
Silver Line (Pittsburgh)